Euscirrhopterus poeyi, the pullback moth, is a moth of the family Noctuidae. The species was first described by Augustus Radcliffe Grote in 1866. It is found from southern Florida and Mexico, through Central America to Brazil. It is also found in the Caribbean, including Cuba.

The wingspan is about 34 mm for females and 38 mm for males. Adults are sexually dimorphic. Males are smaller and their wings are characterized by large areas of hyaline (glass-like) membrane lacking scales. Females are larger without the hyaline membranous areas. The general color is a dark gray brown.

The larvae feed on Pisonia aculeata.

References

Moths described in 1866
Agaristinae